Ridgers is a surname. Notable people with the surname include:

Derek Ridgers (born 1952), English photographer
Mark Ridgers (born 1990), Scottish football goalkeeper

See also
Rodgers